Terres-de-Caux is a commune in the department of Seine-Maritime, northern France. The municipality was established on 1 January 2017 by merger of the former communes of Fauville-en-Caux (the seat), Auzouville-Auberbosc, Bennetot, Bermonville, Ricarville, Sainte-Marguerite-sur-Fauville and Saint-Pierre-Lavis.

Population

See also 
Communes of the Seine-Maritime department

References 

Communes of Seine-Maritime